Yeshi Dorji (born on 10 October 2001) is a Bhutanese international footballer, currently playing for Paro FC.

Club career
Starting in 2014, he played for Druk Stars FC’s U-16 squad for three years. Yeshi played for played for Ugyen Academy F.C. during the 2018-2019 campaign, before getting his big move to Paro FC in 2020. Yeshi won the 2021 Bhutan Premier League with Paro FC and claimed the top scorer award along the way with 24 goals.

Interest from abroad
In January 2020, Yeshi signed a contract with a German football agency, TF Sports, and had a successful trial with VfB Fichte Bielefeld in the Landesliga Westfalen (VII) (Germany sixth division). He was about to become the first Bhutanese to play in Europe, but had to return home because of a visa issue and the ongoing COVID-19 pandemic in Bhutan. In 2021, he received an offer to play on trial in the Cypriot Second Division, but eventually turned it down due to the travel cost.

International career

Youth
At the 2020 AFC U-19 Championship qualifiers, Yeshi scored as Bhutan snatched a surprising 2–1 victory over Bangladesh. He scored against Nepal in the 2019 SAFF U-18 Championship, as Bhutan trashed the hosts 3-0. Yeshi was one of the key players in the 2019 South Asian Games in Nepal where Bhutan won the silver medal. During the tournament he struck a goal against Sri Lanka in a 3-1 victory.

Senior
He made his first appearance for the Bhutan national football team in 2019 against Guam during the 2022 FIFA World Cup qualifiers, and became the only footballer in the country to play all youth levels (U-18, U-19, U-23), and make his senior national team debut in only 149 days.

References

2001 births
Living people
Bhutanese footballers
Bhutan international footballers
Association football forwards
South Asian Games silver medalists for Bhutan
South Asian Games medalists in football